Grand Central could refer to two different buildings in Liverpool, England:

 Grand Central Hall, a former Methodist church
 Unite Grand Central, student halls of residence